Uí Maine was the name of a kingdom situated in south Connacht, consisting of all of County Galway east of Athenry, all of southern and central County Roscommon.

In prehistory it was believed to have spanned the River Shannon, and in the 8th century even briefly extended its dominion west to Galway Bay. It existed as an independent kingdom from prehistoric times, and as a subject kingdom up to the end of the medieval era.

The acknowledged senior branch of the Ó Ceallaigh (O'Kelly) Uí Maine is the O'Kelly de Gallagh and Tycooly (see Irish nobility and Chief of the Name), and are Counts of the Holy Roman Empire. Other branches include: O'Kelly of Aughrim, O'Kelly of Mullaghmore, O'Kelly of Clondoyle, O'Kelly de Galway, Ó Ceallaigh Iarthar Chláir, O'Kelly of Gurtray, O'Kelly of Screen, and O'Kelly Farrell.

Semi-historic kings

All dates approximate.

Maine Mór, fl. c.357–407
Breasal mac Maine Mór, fl. c.407–c.437
Fiachra Finn, fl. c.437–c.454
Connall Cas Ciabhach, fl. c.454–c.476
Dallán mac Breasal, fl. c.476–c.487
Duach mac Dallán, fl. c.487–c.503
Lughaidh mac Dallán, fl. c.503–c.517
Feradhach mac Lughaidh, fl. c.517–c.541

Early historic kings

Maine mac Cearbhall, d. 531/537
Marcán, fl. c. 541–556
Cairbre Crom, fl. c.556
Brenainn mac Cairbre, died 597/601
Aedh Buidhe, killed 600
Conall mac Máele Dúib (slain 629)
Marcán mac Tommáin (slain 653)
Fithceallach mac Flainn, died 691
Seachnasach, died 711
Dluthach mac Fithcheallach, died 738
Cathal Maenmaighe, died 745
Ailello hui Daimine, died 749
Inreachtach mac Dluthach, died 750
Aedh Ailghin, killed 767
Dunchadh ua Daimhine, died 780
Conall mac Fidhghal, died 782
Duncadho mac Duib Da Tuadh, died 784
Amhalgaidh, died 786
Ailell mac Inreachtach, died 791/799
Dub Dá Leithe mac Tomaltach, died 816
Cathal mac Murchadh, killed 816
Cathal mac Ailell, died 844

High medieval kings

Mughroin mac Sochlachan, died 904
Sochlachan mac Diarmata, died 909
Murchadh mac Sochlachan, died 936
Murchadh mac Aodha, died 960
Geibennach mac Aedha, died 973
Muirgus mac Domnaill, died 986
Tadhg Mór Ua Cellaigh, died 1014
Gadra son of Dúnadach died AI1027.4
Concobar mac Tadg Ua Cellaigh, died 1030
Mac Tadhg Ua Cellaigh, died 1065
Dunchadh Ua Cellaigh, died 1074
Aed Ua Cellaigh, died 1134
Diarmaid Ua Madadhan, died 1135
Tadhg Ua Cellaigh, abducted 1145
Conchobar Maenmaige Ua Cellaigh, died 1180
Murrough Ua Cellaigh, died 1186
Domnall Mór Ua Cellaigh, died 1221

Post-Norman kings

Conchobar Ó Cellaigh, reigned 1221–1268
Maine Mor Ó Cellaigh, 1268–1271
Domnall Ó Cellaig, 1271–1295
Donnchad Muimnech Ó Cellaigh, 1295–1307
Gilbert Ó Cellaigh, first reign 1307–1315
Tadhg Ó Cellaigh, 1315–1316
Conchobar mac Domnall Ó Cellaigh, 1316–1318
Gilbert Ó Cellaigh, second reign, 1318–1322
Aed Ó Cellaigh, c.1322–?
Ruaidri Ó Cellaigh, c.1332–1339
Tadgh Óg Ó Cellaigh, 1339–1340

Kings of the Clanricarde era

Diarmaid Ó Cellaigh, c.1340–c.1349
William Ua Cellaig, c.1349–1381
Maelsechlainn Ó Cellaigh, 1381–1402
Conchobar an Abaidh Ó Cellaigh, 1402–1403
Tadgh Ruadh Ó Cellaigh, 1403–1410
Donnchadh Ó Cellaigh, 1410–1424
Aedh mac Brian Ó Cellaigh, 1424–1467
Aedh na gCailleach Ó Cellaigh, 1467–1469
Tadhg Caech Ó Cellaigh, 1469–1476 King of East Uí Maine
William Ó Cellaigh King of Iar Uí Maine 1472–1476, all Uí Maine 1476–1487
Maelsechlainn mac Aedh Ó Cellaigh, 1488–1489
Conchobar Óg mac Aedh Ó Cellaigh, 1489–1499
Donnchadh mac Breasal Ó Cellaigh, 1489–?

Early modern chiefs

Maelsechlainn mac Tadhg Ó Cellaigh, 1499–1511
Tadhg mac Maolsheachlainn Ó Cellaigh, 1511–1513
Maelsechlainn mac William Ó Cellaigh, c.1513–1521
Domnall mac Aedh na gCailleach Ó Cellaigh, c.1521– c.1536
Donnchadh mac Eamonn Ó Cellaigh, 1536–after 1557
Ceallach Ó Cellaigh, after 1557–after 1573
Eigneachan Ó Cellaigh, c.1573–after 1580
Aedh mac Donnchadh Ó Cellaig, after 1580–1590
Tomás MacCnaimhín (Tomás Hugh MacKnavin O'Kelly) 1590–1602 (executed)
Feardorcha Ó Cellaigh, 1602–1611

Chiefs of the Name
 Melaghlin Ó Cellaigh, died 1637, father of 
 Teige Ó Cellaigh of Aughrim, father of 
 James O'Kelly, died 12 July 1691, at the Battle of Aughrim, father of 
 John O'Kelly, died between 26 November 1732 and 13 February 1733, father of 
 James Kelly, elder half-brother of 
 Oliver Kelly, brother of 
 Matthias Kelly, brother of 
 William Kelly of Buckfield, d. 15 November 1760, father of 
 Edmund Kelly of Buckfield, father of 
 William Kelly of Buckfield, father of 
 Thomas Kelly of Buckfield, brother of 
 Edmond Kelly of Buckfield, father of 
 William Kelly, succeeded by his cousin, Count O'Kelly

References

Further reading

Books
 The Tribes and Customs of Hy-Many, Commonly Called O'Kelly's Country, John O'Donovan (Dublin, 1843).
 The Parish of Ballinasloe, Fr. Jerome A. Fahey.
 Notes on the O'Kelly Family, E. Festus Kelly, pp. 140–150, Journal of the Galway Archaeological and Historical Society, volume 16, Nos. iii & iv (1934–5).
 The Surnames of Ireland, Edward MacLysaght (Dublin, 1978).
 A New History of Ireland – lists and genealogies, vol. 9 (Oxford, 1984).
 Dictionary of Irish Biography ... to the Year 2002, pp. 591–622 (Cambridge, 2010).
 O'Kelly. An Irish Musical Family in Nineteenth-Century France, Axel Klein (Norderstedt, 2014).

Online sources
 
 
 
 
 Revised edition of McCarthy's synchronisms at Trinity College Dublin.

 
Lists of Irish monarchs
O'Kelly family
People from County Galway
People from County Roscommon